Mr. Zoob (alternative spellings: Mr Zoob, Mr Z'OOB, Mr Z'oob) is an alternative rock band formed in Koszalin, Poland in 1983. The band's music is a mix of rock music, reggae, ska and its characteristic thanks to sound of stertorous saxophone.

Discography

Albums 
 To tylko ja (1986)
 Czego się gapisz (1998)
 Kawałek podłogi – Od początku (2008)
 Rock & skaczące piosenki (2008)

Singles 
 "A ja się śmieję w głos" (1984)
 "Yeti" (1984)
 "Nie, nie kochaj mnie" (1985)
 "Tylko jeden krok" (1985)
 "Mój jest ten kawałek podłogi"
 "Krzysiek – Zdzisiek"
 "Zęby" (1996)
 "Ja tu czekam"
 "To nie jest Ameryka"
 "Kto to jest" (2005)
 "Moja głowa"
 "Dotykaj mnie" (2009)
 "PESEL" (2010)
 "Słońca tylko brak" (2010)
 "Piosenka o nieszkodliwości" (2010)
 "Dotyka mnie"

Compilations 
 Sztuka latania (1985) (Savitor SVT015)

References 

Polish alternative rock groups
Polish reggae musical groups